The Xian H-20 (alternatively Xian H-X) is a projected subsonic stealth bomber design of the People's Liberation Army Air Force. It is referred to as a strategic project by the People's Liberation Army. The H-20 will be the first dedicated strategic bomber developed by China. The aircraft may enter service in the 2020s.

The development of a strategic bomber was revealed in September 2016.

Design and development
In 2016, People's Liberation Army Air Force (PLAAF) general Ma Xiaotian announced that China was developing a new type of long-range bomber on the air force's open day. In 2018, a Chinese military spokesperson confirmed the development was making "great progress".

According to the United States Department of Defense, the H-20 is expected to be a flying wing with a range of at least 8,500 km and a payload capacity of at least 10 tonnes; according to the Rand Corporation, an American funded thinktank, it will allow China "to reliably threaten U.S. targets within and beyond the
Second Island Chain, to include key U.S. military bases in Guam and Hawaii." The payload is projected to be at least 10 tonnes of conventional or nuclear weapons. 

Throughout the years, multiple models and computer-generated pictures have surfaced on the internet, some published by magazines run by state-owned defense companies. Defense analysts have noted several recurring features on these models, including serrated air intakes, cranked-kite wings, and foldable twin tail surfaces that can be switched between being horizontal tailplanes and V-tails.

In July 2022, Chinese state media suggested the H-20 was close to taking its maiden flight.

See also

References

Citations

Sources

External links

Chinese bomber aircraft
H-20
Stealth aircraft
Proposed military aircraft